Lasqueti Island is an island off the east coast of Vancouver Island in the Strait of Georgia, qathet Regional District, British Columbia, Canada and has a population of 498. A passenger-only ferry connects the island to the community of French Creek, near Parksville. The ferry makes two to three runs per day, six days per week, weather permitting. The ferry service is run by Western Pacific Marine for BC Ferries.

History
Lasqueti Island was named in 1791 by Spanish Naval officer José María Narváez, commander of the Santa Saturnina (see Juan Carrasco (explorer)) after Juan Maria Lasqueti, a prominent Spanish naval officer.

Community
 The island community is an enclave of Canadian counter-culture. Lasqueti Island is one of the least developed of the major Gulf Islands. Its roads are mostly unpaved, and it is the only one of the larger Gulf Islands that is not currently connected to BC Hydro's electrical power grid. Solar, wind, micro-hydro, and fossil fueled generators power the island.

There is a hotel and a restaurant in False Bay, where the ferry arrives and departs. There are at least three B&B's on the island, but services are seasonal and very limited. Potable water may be scarce at times, in different places on the island. There are local markets and an informal food cooperative but they operate at odd hours, depending on the season and demand. Lasqueti island has a yearly Arts Festival on Canada Day weekend, and other activities. These different festivals and informal activities feature local painters, sculptors, poets, fiction writers, and historians.  Performing arts, on the Canada Day long-weekend, include: The Bolting Brassicas (marching band), the Lasquirkus (circus), and other activities.

The island has a reputation for sailing and sea kayaking which is considered among some of the finest, but also among the most challenging, in lower British Columbia. Tides and currents may become foreboding without warning - the winter weather down the Strait of Georgia has been responsible for various mariners' deaths.

Police and Fire Services
The island is currently under the jurisdiction of the Oceanside RCMP detachment, based out of Parksville. The island maintains a two truck volunteer fire department.

Demographics
The island had a population of 498 in the 2021 Canadian census, up 24.8% from the 2016 Canadian census. It has a land area of 73.32 km² (28.3 sq mi).

Aquaculture and agriculture

Aquaculture includes clams, geoducks, oysters, honey mussels, and prawns. Agriculture include seasonal vegetables, orchards, nuts, and berries. There are a few farms on Lasqueti Island. Their products range from blueberries, apple juice, eggs, to maple syrup. There also is a shellfish farm and a shellfish hatchery.

Flora and fauna
The island is generally divided between drier areas, characterized by the presence of native arbutus, cacti, and other succulent plants, and wetter areas featuring red cedar. Some old growth forest still exists on this island as well, providing habitat for a unique mix of flora and fauna. The understory of the forests on the island have seen extensive damage due to the proliferation of feral sheep.

Geography
The soils on this island for the most part are shallow, stony deposits over bedrock which is almost entirely igneous and largely basaltic.

Parks
Squitty Bay is Lasqueti Island’s only Provincial Park. There is also the Lasqueti Island Ecological Reserve. Camping or campfires are not allowed at any of the parks on Lasqueti Island.

Jedediah Island Marine Provincial Park and Sabine Channel Provincial Park are provincial parks that exist on nearby islands. Camping is allowed at both of these provincial parks. Jedediah Island Marine Provincial Park is the site of a heritage farm of a former settler.

In popular culture
Lasqueti Island is featured in an investigative news report by Global's 16x9 called Off the Grid, which aired on April 28, 2012.

Islands near Lasqueti Island
Major:
Texada Island
Minor:
Jedediah Island
Finnerty Islands
Jervis Island
Bull Island
Sangster Island
Jenkins Island
Sisters Lighthouse

See also 

 Rand Holmes

References

External links

Islands of the Gulf Islands
Populated places in the qathet Regional District
Unincorporated settlements in British Columbia